Helen Moros (2 November 1967 – 6 February 2003) was a New Zealand long-distance runner. In 1993, she won the 10,000 metres New Zealand national title in Wellington, recording a time of 32:32.24. She competed in the marathon event at the 1990 Commonwealth Games in Auckland, placing seventh. Also in 1990, she placed third and fourth at the Los Angeles and Chicago marathons, respectively. Outside of athletics, Moros was a schoolteacher.

On Waitangi Day 2003, Moros died at age 35 after collapsing at her Mount Wellington home. Having lived with anorexia since her adolescence, her death was reported to have been caused by a heart attack. Her funeral was held in Auckland on 10 February 2003.

References

1967 births
2003 deaths
20th-century New Zealand women
21st-century New Zealand women
Athletes (track and field) at the 1990 Commonwealth Games
Neurological disease deaths in New Zealand
Deaths from anorexia nervosa
New Zealand female long-distance runners